This is a list of Buddhist temples, monasteries, stupas, and pagodas in Malaysia for which there are Wikipedia articles, sorted by location.

Johor
 Ching Giap See Temple

Kelantan
 Wat Phothivihan

Kuala Lumpur

 Buddhist Maha Vihara, Brickfields
 Thai Buddhist Chetawan Temple
 Thean Hou Temple

Malacca
 Cheng Hoon Teng Temple (oldest Buddhist temple in Malaysia)
 Xiang Lin Si Temple

Pahang
 Chin Swee Caves Temple

Penang

 Dhammikarama Burmese Temple
 Kek Lok Si Temple (槟城极乐寺)
 Mahindarama Buddhist Temple
 Nibbinda Forest Monastery (丛林道场)
 Wat Buppharam
 Wat Chaiyamangkalaram

Perak
 Kek Look Seah Temple
 Sam Poh Tong Temple
 Sukhavana Meditation Monastery 
 Sasanarakkha Buddhist Sanctuary

Sabah

 Fo Guang Shan Temple, Tawau
 Peak Nam Toong Temple
 Pu Tuo Si Temple
 Puu Jih Shih Temple

Sarawak
 Ching San Yen Temple
 Jade Dragon Temple

Archaeological sites
 Bujang Valley

See also
 Buddhism in Malaysia
 List of Buddhist temples
 Malaysian Buddhist Institute
 Mahanavika Buddhagupta

Notes

External links

 BuddhaNet's Comprehensive Directory of Buddhist Temples sorted by country
 Buddhactivity Dharma Centres database

 
 
Malaysia
Buddhist temples